St. Joseph's Catholic High School is a Roman Catholic high school managed by the Renfrew County Catholic District School Board (RCCDSB), in Renfrew, Ontario, Canada.

Organization
The school educates in grades 8–12 in English. It has approximately 550 students as of the 2016–17 school year.

Principals
2008 - June 2011: Mark Searson
September 2011 – June 2019: Brennan Trainor
Principal Derek Lennox September 2019 – Present

Academic standards
The Fraser Institute report card for 2011-12 placed the school as a joint third out of 725 high schools in the province of Ontario. The school achieved a score of 9.2 out of 10.

Sport and extra-curricular activities
The school's sports teams are known as the "Jaguars." The midget girls' discus provincial championship at the 2011 Ontario high school track and field championships was won by St. Joseph's Sonya Bergin. The school were National Champions in the Reach for the Top televised quiz competition in 1992–93.

Controversies
In February of 2023, the school's administration suspended a student for publicly voicing scientific truisms about gender in class. The student, Josh Alexander, was later arrested for breaching a subsequent exclusion order. The school's disciplinary actions were considered to be controversial by some, most notably  Canadian media outlets, due to alleged conflict with the school's Catholic beliefs. Parents of transgender students attending the school have voiced disappointment in these negative responses to the school's stated attempts to protect transgender students from harassment.

References

External links
 

Catholic secondary schools in Ontario
High schools in Renfrew County
Educational institutions in Canada with year of establishment missing